Sinnamary Aerodrome  is a former aerodrome serving Sinnamary, a commune of French Guiana on the Sinnamary River,  in from the Caribbean coast. The runway is just east of the town. It was open in 1964 and closed in 1991.

See also

 List of airports in French Guiana
 Transport in French Guiana

References

External links
OpenStreetMap - Sinnamary

Defunct airports
Airports in French Guiana
Buildings and structures in Sinnamary